Bellair is a historic plantation house located near New Bern, Craven County, North Carolina.  It was built about 1792 (verified by dendrochronology), and is a two-story, seven bay, central hall plan Georgian style brick dwelling.  It sits on a high basement and has a three-bay, central projecting pavilion.

It was listed on the National Register of Historic Places in 1972.

References

Plantation houses in North Carolina
Houses on the National Register of Historic Places in North Carolina
Georgian architecture in North Carolina
Houses completed in 1763
Houses in New Bern, North Carolina
National Register of Historic Places in Craven County, North Carolina